Oxkraal Dam is a zoned earth-fill/rock-fill type dam located on the Oxkraal River, about 8  km South West of Whittlesea, Eastern Cape, South Africa. It was created in 1989 and serves mainly for irrigation purposes. The hazard potential of the dam has been ranked high (3).

See also
List of reservoirs and dams in South Africa
List of rivers of South Africa

References 

 List of South African Dams from the Department of Water Affairs and Forestry (South Africa)

Dams in South Africa